Sébastien Lareau and Jeff Tarango were the defending champions but only Tarango competed that year with David Pate.

Pate and Tarango lost in the quarterfinals to Kent Kinnear and Kevin Ullyett.

Rick Leach and Jonathan Stark won in the final 6–4, 6–4 against Kinnear and Ullyett.

Seeds

  Rick Leach /  Jonathan Stark (champions)
  Wayne Arthurs /  Jack Waite (first round)
  David Pate /  Jeff Tarango (quarterfinals)
  Tim Henman /  Gary Muller (semifinals)

Draw

References
 1996 KAL Cup Korea Open Doubles Draw

Seoul Open
1996 ATP Tour
1996 Seoul Open